No. 232 (Transport) Group RAF was a group of the Royal Air Force, active in 1945–46.

It was formed 24 February 1945 from the RAF Element of the Combat Cargo Task Force, and appears to have included No. 436 Squadron RCAF. It disbanded on 15 August 1946. It was officially a Transport Command Group, operating under control of HQ Air Command South-East Asia. Air Commodore Alfred Earle was Air Officer Commanding, having arrived from command of No. 300 Group in Australia.

It had a communication squadron, No. 232 Group Communication Squadron.

See also 
 List of Royal Air Force Communication units

References 

http://discovery.nationalarchives.gov.uk/browse/r/h/C30623 - records at National Archives, Kew

232
232
Military units and formations established in 1945
Military units and formations disestablished in 1946